The Police (Northern Ireland) Act 2003 (c 6) is an Act of the Parliament of the United Kingdom.

It implements recommendations made in the Patten report.

Sections 14 to 19 were repealed by Part 2 of Schedule 8 to the Justice Act (Northern Ireland) 2011.

Paragraphs 3 to 5 of Schedule 4 to the Policing (Miscellaneous Provisions) (Northern Ireland) Order 2007 would have inserted new sections 30(6)(d) and 30(11), and a new Part 3A in Schedule 2. However, the said paragraphs 3 to 5 were repealed by Part 13 of Schedule 8 to the Policing and Crime Act 2009, without ever having been brought into force.

Section 23 - Appointment of constables with special policing skills
Sections 23(1) to (5) expired on 8 April 2005 by virtue of section 23(6). They were restored by article 10(1) of the Policing (Miscellaneous Provisions) (Northern Ireland) Order 2007 (S.I. 2007/912) (N.I. 6).

Article 10(2) of that Order substituted a reference to the date on which that Order came into force for the reference to the date on which this Act was passed in section 23(6).

Section 26 - Protected disclosures by police officers
Sections 26(1) to (3) came into force on 15 December 2004.

Section 30
Sections 30(1)(d), (6)(d) and (11) were repealed by Part 13 of Schedule 8 to the Policing and Crime Act 2009.

Section 30A - Community support officers
This section was inserted by article 7(2) of the Policing (Miscellaneous Provisions) (Northern Ireland) Order 2007.

Article 11(2) of the Northern Ireland Act 1998 (Devolution of Policing and Justice Functions) Order 2012 (SI 2007/2595) substituted the words "Department of Justice" for the words "Secretary of State" in section 30A(8).

Section 33
The references to section 30A in sections 33(1) and (4) were inserted by article 7(3) of Policing (Miscellaneous Provisions) (Northern Ireland) Order 2007.

Section 34
Article 93(2)(a) and (b)(i) of the Northern Ireland Act 1998 (Devolution of Policing and Justice Functions) Order 2010 (SI 2010/976) substituted the words "Department of Justice" for the words "Secretary of State" in sections 34(1) and (4). Article 93(2)(b)(ii) of that Order substituted the words "the Department of Justice" for the word "him" in section 34(4)(e).

The references to section 30A in sections 34(1)(a) and (3) were inserted by article 7(4) of Policing (Miscellaneous Provisions) (Northern Ireland) Order 2007.

Section 34A
This section was inserted by article 93(3) of the Northern Ireland Act 1998 (Devolution of Policing and Justice Functions) Order 2010.

Section 35
The references to section 30A in sections 35(1)(a) and (b) were inserted by article 7(5) of Policing (Miscellaneous Provisions) (Northern Ireland) Order 2007.

Section 36
The references to section 30A in sections 36(1) and (2) were inserted by article 7(6) of Policing (Miscellaneous Provisions) (Northern Ireland) Order 2007.

Section 37
Article 93(4) of the Northern Ireland Act 1998 (Devolution of Policing and Justice Functions) Order 2010 substituted the words "Department of Justice" for the words "Secretary of State" in sections 37(1).

The references to section 30A in sections 37(1) and (3) were inserted by article 7(7) of Policing (Miscellaneous Provisions) (Northern Ireland) Order 2007.

Section 41
Article 11(3) of the Northern Ireland Act 1998 (Devolution of Policing and Justice Functions) Order 2012 substituted the words "Department of Justice" for the words "Secretary of State" in section 41(2).

Section 42 - Intimate samples
Sections 42(1) to (5) came into force on 1 March 2007.

Section 44 - Orders and regulations
Article 93(5)(a) of the Northern Ireland Act 1998 (Devolution of Policing and Justice Functions) Order 2010 inserted the words "or the Department of Justice" after the words "Secretary of State" in section 44(1).

Section 44(4) and the references to sections 15(6) and 16(2) and 19(2) in sections 44(3) and (5) were repealed by Part 2 of Schedule 8 to the Justice Act (Northern Ireland) 2011.

Article 93(5)(b) of the Northern Ireland Act 1998 (Devolution of Policing and Justice Functions) Order 2010 inserted the words "by the Secretary of State" after the word "made" in sections 44(5). The word ", 41(2)" in section 44(5) was repealed by article 11(3)(b) of the Northern Ireland Act 1998 (Devolution of Policing and Justice Functions) Order 2012.

Section 44(6) was inserted by article 93(5)(c) of the Northern Ireland Act 1998 (Devolution of Policing and Justice Functions) Order 2010. The words "(other than an order under section 41(2))" after "under this Act" in section 44(6) were inserted by article 11(3)(c) of the Northern Ireland Act 1998 (Devolution of Policing and Justice Functions) Order 2012.

Schedule 1 - Belfast
This Schedule was repealed by Part 2 of Schedule 8 to the Justice Act (Northern Ireland) 2011.

Schedule 2
Paragraphs 2A and 2B were inserted by paragraph 2 of Schedule 1 to the Policing (Miscellaneous Provisions) (Northern Ireland) Order 2007.

The words "or by a person authorised to accompany him under Article 18(2) of that Order" after "by a constable" in paragraph 6 were inserted by paragraph 3 of Schedule 1 to the Policing (Miscellaneous Provisions) (Northern Ireland) Order 2007.

The words "to keep that person under control and" after "duty" in paragraph 8(3)(b) were inserted by paragraph 4(b) of Schedule 1 to the Policing (Miscellaneous Provisions) (Northern Ireland) Order 2007. The words "and under his control" at the end of paragraph 8(3)(c) were inserted by paragraph 4(c) of Schedule 1 to the Policing (Miscellaneous Provisions) (Northern Ireland) Order 2007.

Paragraph 8A was inserted by paragraph 5 of Schedule 1 to the Policing (Miscellaneous Provisions) (Northern Ireland) Order 2007.

Paragraph 10A was inserted by paragraph 6 of Schedule 1 to the Policing (Miscellaneous Provisions) (Northern Ireland) Order 2007.

Paragraphs 20A to 20D were inserted by paragraph 2 of Schedule 2 to the Policing (Miscellaneous Provisions) (Northern Ireland) Order 2007.

The words "paragraph (1A) of Article 32" were substituted for the words "paragraph (1) of Article 32" in paragraph 22(1)(a) by paragraph 6 of Schedule 1 to the Criminal Justice (Northern Ireland) Order 2004 (SI 2004/1500) (NI 9). The words "to keep that person under control and" after "duty" in paragraph 22(1)(c)(ii) were inserted by paragraph 2(2)(a) of Schedule 3 to the Policing (Miscellaneous Provisions) (Northern Ireland) Order 2007. The words "and under his control" at the end of paragraph 22(1)(c)(iii) were inserted by paragraph 2(2)(b) of Schedule 3 to the Policing (Miscellaneous Provisions) (Northern Ireland) Order 2007. Paragraph 22(1)(d) was inserted by paragraph 2(3) of Schedule 3 to the Policing (Miscellaneous Provisions) (Northern Ireland) Order 2007.

The words "to keep that person under control and" after "duty" in paragraph 23(2)(b) were inserted by paragraph 3(2)(a) of Schedule 3 to the Policing (Miscellaneous Provisions) (Northern Ireland) Order 2007. The words "and under his control" at the end of paragraph 23(2)(c) were inserted by paragraph 3(2)(b) of Schedule 3 to the Policing (Miscellaneous Provisions) (Northern Ireland) Order 2007. Paragraph 23(2A) was inserted by paragraph 3(3) of Schedule 3 to the Policing (Miscellaneous Provisions) (Northern Ireland) Order 2007.

Part 3A was repealed by Part 13 of Schedule 8 to the Policing and Crime Act 2009.

Schedule 2A
This Schedule was inserted by article 7(8) of, and Schedule 5 to, Policing (Miscellaneous Provisions) (Northern Ireland) Order 2007.

The words "or 4" in paragraph 2(4)(d) were repealed by Part 3 of Schedule 4 to the Clean Neighbourhoods and Environment Act (Northern Ireland) 2011.

The words "or (1AA)" after "subsection (1)" in paragraph 6(1) were inserted by paragraph 28(2)(a) of Schedule 7 to the Policing and Crime Act 2009. The words "subsections (1), (1AA) and (4) (but not the reference in subsection (1AB) (removal))" were substituted for the words "subsections (1) and (4) (but not the reference in subsection (5) (arrest))" in paragraph 6(1) by paragraph 28(2)(b) of Schedule 7 to the Policing and Crime Act 2009. The words "section 1(1AA)" were substituted for the words "section 1(1)" in paragraph 6(2) by paragraph 28(3) of Schedule 7 to the Policing and Crime Act 2009.

Paragraph 9A was inserted by paragraph 4 of Schedule 5 to the Psychoactive Substances Act 2016.

As to the effect of paragraph 16, see paragraph 6 of Schedule 2 to the Terrorism Act 2000 (Remedial) Order 2011 (SI 2011/631). The words "section 47A(2)(a) and (d), (3)(b) and (6)" were substituted for the words "sections 44(1)(a) and (d) and (2)(b) and 45(2)" in paragraph 16(1) by paragraph 31(a)(i) of Schedule 9 to the Protection of Freedoms Act 2012. The words "anything which is" were substituted for the words "any article" in paragraph 16(1)(d) by paragraph 31(a)(ii) of Schedule 9 to the Protection of Freedoms Act 2012. Paragraph 16(1)(d) was also amended by paragraph 31(a)(iii) of Schedule 9 to the Protection of Freedoms Act 2012. The words "subsections (4) and (5) of section 47A of, and paragraphs 1 and 2 of Schedule 6B to," were substituted for the words "subsections (1) and (4) of section 45 of" in paragraph 16(2) by paragraph 31(b) of Schedule 9 to the Protection of Freedoms Act 2012.

See also
Police (Northern Ireland) Act 2000
Police Act

References

External links
The Police (Northern Ireland) Act 2003, as amended from the National Archives.
The Police (Northern Ireland) Act 2003, as originally enacted from the National Archives.
Explanatory notes to the Police (Northern Ireland) Act 2003.

United Kingdom Acts of Parliament 2003
Acts of the Parliament of the United Kingdom concerning Northern Ireland
Government of Northern Ireland
Northern Ireland peace process
Police Service of Northern Ireland
2003 in Northern Ireland
Police legislation in the United Kingdom